Martin Hoff Ekroll (16 February 1865–15 May 1916) was a Norwegian merchant, mountaineer and Arctic explorer.

He was born in the village of Skroven in the islands of Lofoten  in Nordland, Norway. He operated a fishing station at Kabelvåg on the island of Austvågøya. In 1891 he published a plan for an expedition to the North Pole (in ). He funded and organized an expedition to the island of Edgeøya,  located in the Svalbard archipelago 1894–1895. At Edgeøya, the bay of Ekrollhamna and the headland of Martinodden are both named after him. He made a first ascent of the mountain of Vågakallen on the island of Austvågøy about 1885. In 1888 he made a failed attempt of climbing the mountain of Stetind.

References

1865 births
1916 deaths
People from Vågan
Norwegian merchants
Norwegian polar explorers
Norwegian mountain climbers
19th-century Norwegian businesspeople